Gadsup may refer to:
Gadsup people
Gadsup language